Watered Lawn is the first studio album by American record producer Raleigh Moncrief. It was released on Anticon on October 25, 2011.

Reception
Al Horner of Drowned in Sound gave the album an 8 out of 10, describing it as "a dizzying rush of grinding synths, sun-splashed harmonies and wide-eyed eccentricity – with a strange beauty to match its outlandishness."

It was ranked at number 19 on Tiny Mix Tapes "Favorite 25 Album Covers of 2011" list.

Track listing

References

External links
 
 

2011 debut albums
Anticon albums